The King's Cup is a 1933 British drama film directed by Alan Cobham, Donald Macardle, Herbert Wilcox and Robert Cullen and starring Chili Bouchier, Harry Milton and William Kendall. The film is named after the King's Cup air race, established by King George V in 1922 as an endurance race across Britain, to encourage development in engine design and the sport of aviation. Stars Chili Bouchier and Harry Milton were married at the time the film was made.

Plot summary
A pilot who has lost his nerve following an accident regains it after meeting a woman and goes on to win a major air race.

Cast
 Chili Bouchier as Betty Conway
 Harry Milton as Dick Carter
 William Kendall as Captain Richards
 Rene Ray as Peggy
 Tom Helmore as Ronnie
 Lewis Shaw as Peter
 Sydney King as Crasher
 Leila Page as Lena
 Syd Crossley as Crossley
 Lew Stone as himself

Critical reception
TV Guide gave the film one out of four stars, and wrote, "the novelty of four directors did nothing out of the ordinary in terms of what appears on the screen." while The Cinema Museum noted "a tantalizing glimpse of the (Brooklands) airfield and some of the flying that took place there before the Second World War."

References

External links

1933 films
1933 drama films
British drama films
British black-and-white films
British and Dominions Studios films
Films shot at Imperial Studios, Elstree
Films directed by Herbert Wilcox
British aviation films
1930s English-language films
1930s British films